The Fut were a short-lived rock group formed in London in 1969, consisting of Maurice Gibb, Steve Groves, Steve Kipner and Billy Lawrie (the brother of singer Lulu and Gibb's brother-in-law and sometime songwriting partner).  Their only single was "Have You Heard the Word", released in the UK on Beacon Records. This was the first time since the formation of the Bee Gees that Gibb, who was still in the group, had performed with another group without them. Groves and Kipner were members of the group Tin Tin.

"Have You Heard the Word" was written by Groves and Kipner, and recorded on 6 August 1969. Later in 8 August, Lawrie recorded "Super Duck", and Gibb also participated on that recording. They were both released as singles sometime the following year.

Members
 Maurice Gibb  — lead vocals, bass (from the Bee Gees)
 Steve Groves — lead vocals, guitar (from Tin Tin)
 Steve Kipner — lead vocals, piano (from Tin Tin)
 Billy Lawrie — background vocals

References

Maurice Gibb
Musical groups established in 1969
Musical groups disestablished in 1969
British supergroups
Rock music supergroups
English rock music groups
British soft rock music groups
Musical groups from London